Space Police: Defenders of the Crown is the tenth studio album by the German power metal band Edguy. It was released on 18 April 2014 through Nuclear Blast. The cover art was unveiled on 1 February, and 15 days later, the band announced the track listing.

Background and recording  
The band's vocalist and frontman, Tobias Sammet, has promoted the album as the heaviest the band has ever done. It was composed over two months, with the band members working altogether at the same studio with producer Sascha Paeth.  The band said of the album:

In an interview, Tobias and lead guitarist Jens Ludwig explained that the title of the album is based on two of its tracks, because they thought both names would be suitable for the new work. According to Tobias, Defenders of the Crown is a reference to Edguy being the real "defender of the heavy metal crown", while Space Police sounded like Frank Zappa or David Bowie and is a title that most heavy metal bands would not use. In another interview, Tobias commented:

Song information 
The opening track "Sabre & Torch" (which received a lyric video on 17 March 2014 ) was written shortly after the 2013 Avantasia tour and refers to the attitude of the band, doing things that other weren't expecting. "We feel like explorers: We go where no man's been before, just armed with the sabre in one hand and a torch in the other..."

The co-title track "Space Police" was described by Tobias as "a track that really reflects what this band is all about. It’s crazy but powerful and very, very creative, catchy... It's got drive." According to him, the term "space police" is a metaphor for people who want to create and enforce laws on territories that should not be limited by rules. More specifically speaking, he criticizes people who try to tell rock bands what to do and what to say when musicians are actually willing to live above rules and without limitations.

Tobias described the single "Love Tyger" as a "tribute to himself". It describes the history of a guy who is brought to Earth by the Gods as a gift to mankind. Its guitar riff was conceived by Tobias himself and the song was thought of even before Age of the Joker, but Tobias decided not to include it in that album nor in Avantasia's The Mystery of Time, due to it being too "light-hearted".

"The Realms of Baba Yaga" was maybe the last song to be written for the album and is about a person that gives in to temptation to a point that they cannot control the situation anymore, using the folkloric witch as a metaphor. Tobias described its guitar solo as the best Ludwig has ever played.

"Rock Me Amadeus" is a cover of Austrian singer Falco. Tobias was first planning to make a cover of "Der Kommissar", but Sascha Paeth suggested he covered "Rock Me Amadeus" instead. It marks the first time Tobias raps and also the first German language song by the band and by him on an album.

"Do Me Like a Cavemen" was co-composed by Ludwig, but the song was subject of many discussions between him and Tobias, who were both unsatisfied with each other's musical inputs. "Shadow Eaters" was also co-composed by Ludwig and it's about the power of one's mind and what can be achieved when focusing on the elimination of negative thoughts.

"Alone in Myself" is about "the feeling of realizing that the world around you does not perceive things the way they should be perceived", and how one can be  misunderstood for not finding the right words for expressing themselves.

The ending and longest track, "The Eternal Wayfarer", talks about the immortality of the soul, which Tobias says he's trying to find evidence of, but is yet to do so. The chorus of the song dates back to 2005-06, by the time of Avantasia's The Scarecrow first sessions.

The limited edition comes with four instrumental versions of regular edition tracks, one progressive version of "Space Police", and two bonus tracks: "England", a song about the United Kingdom and the likes of Steve Harris of Iron Maiden, Bob Catley of Magnum and Scotland's William Wallace; and "Aychim in Hysteria", which is lyrically a tribute to the band's live sound engineer and musically a tribute to British group Def Leppard, specifically to their Hysteria era.

Reception
Space Police has been well received by critics. Writing for All About The Rock, Mark Booth said: "Tobias Sammet is a musical genius as he has proven that you don't have to be serious all the time but can write humorous songs that still are heavy, power and amazingly catchy but stick to the metal roots (like JUDAS PRIEST have done in the past etc) and Tobias is in league with musical genius Devin Townsend."

Track listing

Personnel 
 Edguy
Tobias Sammet – lead and backing vocals, keyboards
Jens Ludwig – guitar
Dirk Sauer – guitar
Tobias "Eggi" Exxel – bass guitar
Felix Bohnke - drums

Additional musicians 
 Michael Rodenberg - additional keyboards
 Oliver Hartmann - backing vocals

Technical staff
 Sascha Paeth - producing, mixing, mastering, engineering 
 Michael Rodenberg - mastering, engineering 
 Ole Reitmeier, engineering 
 Arne "The Schlagerpirat" Wiegand
 Dan Frazier - cover art
 Thomas Ewerhard - design & layout
 Alex Kuehr - photos

Charts

References

External links
Official Edguy site

2014 albums
Edguy albums
Nuclear Blast albums